Real Sociedad de Fútbol is a football club based in Donostia-San Sebastián, Gipuzkoa, Basque Country, Spain.

San Sebastian Football Club was formed on a casual basis in 1905; they first won the Copa del Rey, Spain's primary knockout competition, in 1909 – due to a registration issue their players entered under the name of a local cycling group, Club Ciclista de San Sebastián. Following their victory, they were more formally founded as Sociedad de Fútbol, receiving royal patronage a year later. They eventually won the cup in a more definite manner in 1987, and for a third time in 2020 (with a victory over Athletic Bilbao, their local rivals, in the final which was postponed by a year).

The club were founder members of La Liga in 1929 and have been participant's in the country's highest division for the majority of the time since then (75 seasons as of 2022), with short periods in the lower Segunda División (16 seasons in total). La Real won the championship in consecutive seasons, 1980–81 and 1981–82, with an entirely locally raised and developed squad. Over 100 players have reached the milestone of 100 league appearances for the club; in most cases these were all made in the top division – the list below has a single column for league appearances, indicating where these include lower-division matches.

Real Sociedad first qualified for the UEFA Cup in 1974. As of February 2022, their continental record includes 17 seasons and 92 matches played.

List of players
This list includes all players who have appeared in 100 matches for the club. For all registered players with a Wikipedia article, see :Category:Real Sociedad footballers.

As of 11 March 2022. Current players in bold.

Notes

See also
 List of Basque footballers

References

External links
Crece el club de los 100 en la Real [Growth of the Real 100 club] (in Spanish), Mundo Deportivo, 12 October 2021

 
Players
Real Sociedad
Association football player non-biographical articles